Michał Kamiński (born 17 May 1987) is a Polish volleyball player, a member of Poland men's national volleyball team and Polish club MKS Będzin.

Career

Clubs
In 2007 he achieved silver medal of Polish Championship with Jastrzębski Węgiel. In 2012 AZS Częstochowa, including Kamiński, won CEV Challenge Cup after final with AZS Politechnika Warszawska (3-2).

Sporting achievements

Clubs

CEV Challenge Cup
  2011/2012 - with AZS Czestochowa

National championships
 2006/2007  Polish Championship, with Jastrzębski Węgiel

National team
 2005  CEV U19 European Championship

References

External links

 PlusLiga player profile

1987 births
Living people
Sportspeople from Lower Silesian Voivodeship
Polish men's volleyball players
Expatriate volleyball players in France
Polish expatriates in France
Expatriate volleyball players in Greece
Polish expatriates in Greece
AZS Częstochowa players
Jastrzębski Węgiel players
Trefl Gdańsk players
People from Racibórz County
Sportspeople from Silesian Voivodeship